Gaëtan Roussel (born 13 October 1972, Rodez) is a French singer-songwriter and composer. Roussel is the former lead vocalist for the bands, Louise Attaque and Tarmac.

Roussel embarked on a solo career and began recording an album in 2009. He released his debut solo album, Ginger, which was released on 15 March 2010. Ginger featured the lead single, "Help myself (Nous ne faisons que passer)" and the second single, "Dis-moi encore que tu m'aimes". He released the album Orpailleur in 2013 and Trafic in 2018

Discography

Albums

Singles

References

External links
Gaëtan Roussel official website

1972 births
Living people
People from Rodez
French singer-songwriters
French songwriters
Male songwriters
French composers
French male composers
21st-century French singers
21st-century French male singers
French male singer-songwriters